Wuhu railway station is a railway station in Jinghu District, Wuhu, Anhui, China. It is situated at the intersection of multiple conventional and high-speed lines.

The station is the northern terminus of the Anhui–Jiangxi railway and the southern terminus of the Huainan railway. It is a stop on the Nanjing–Tongling railway, the Nanjing–Anqing intercity railway, and the Shangqiu–Hangzhou high-speed railway.

History 
The first railway station was built in Wuhu with the Anhui–Jiangxi railway and opened in 1933. In 1977, a new station was built on the present site of Wuhu railway station to meet growing demand. This station was rebuilt in 1992. On 20 August 2013, the complete reconstruction of the station began.

Monorail 
An interchange with Line 2 of Wuhu Rail Transit opened on December 28, 2021.

References 

Railway stations in Anhui
Railway stations in China opened in 1933